Jillian Becker (born 2 June 1932) is a South African-born British author, journalist, and lecturer. She specialises in research about terrorism, having written Hitler's Children: The Story of the Baader-Meinhof Terrorist Gang (1977), among other works.

Life
Becker's father, Bernard Friedman, was a South African surgeon and politician who co-founded the anti-apartheid Progressive Party. Becker attended Roedean School in Johannesburg. Becker graduated from the University of the Witwatersrand. She left her first husband, Michael Geber, in South Africa to live in Italy with her second husband, Gerry Becker, later moving to Mountfort Crescent off Barnsbury Square, in London. It was here that Becker's friend, Sylvia Plath, came to stay with her young children in the days immediately before Plath committed suicide and Becker's book about Plath's last days, Giving Up is based.  Becker has been a British citizen since 1960.

Becker is on the council of the Freedom Association. She lives in California.

She is the manager and editor of The Atheist Conservative blog

Published works

She has written an account of the death of her friend, the poet Sylvia Plath, who stayed with Becker for the last weekend of her life. Dissatisfied with the biographers' treatments and after seeing the film script to Sylvia (and declining the opportunity to have anything to do with the film), Becker decided to write her own account of Plath's death: Giving Up: the last days of Sylvia Plath.

Her most famous book, Hitler's Children: The Story of the Baader-Meinhof Terrorist Gang, is about the German Red Army Faction. The book was chosen by Golo Mann as Newsweek (Europe) book of the year 1977 and serialised in newspapers in London, Oslo and Tokyo.

The PLO: The Rise and Fall of the Palestine Liberation Organization was commissioned by Weidenfeld & Nicolson and published in 1984. Becker spent months in Lebanon during the war in which Israel drove the PLO out of that country. She claimed to have retrieved secret documents from ruins of bombed PLO office buildings and to have interviewed Lebanese of all denominations and Palestinians who had experienced PLO oppression, as well as supporters, members and leaders of the PLO.

Institute for the Study of Terrorism
In the 1980s, Becker served in a multi-party working group to advise the British Parliament on measures to combat international terrorism. She was also consulted by the embassies of several countries affected by indigenous terrorist organisations, some of which were supported by foreign nation states. In many of these cases, terrorist activity was an aspect of proxy wars, or what Becker called "the hot spots of the Cold War".

In 1985, with Lord Chalfont, a former minister in the Foreign and Commonwealth Office, she founded the "Institute for the Study of Terrorism" (IST) of which she was executive director from 1985 to 1990.  With Chalfont on the presiding council were Baroness Cox, who was then deputy speaker of the House of Lords, and Lord Orr-Ewing. The institute's International Advisory Council included experts in many Western countries on terrorism, security, weaponry, and geo-politics. In the Institute itself Becker worked with a small staff of researchers and translators. Bernhard Adamczewski was her co-director at IST.

Books

Selected fiction

Non-fiction

References

1932 births
Living people
British non-fiction writers
University of the Witwatersrand alumni
Members of the Freedom Association
Naturalised citizens of the United Kingdom
South African emigrants to the United Kingdom
20th-century British writers
21st-century British writers
20th-century British women writers
21st-century British women writers
20th-century British short story writers
British historical fiction writers
British writers
20th-century atheists
21st-century atheists
Alumni of Roedean School, South Africa